Petr Stoilov (born 30 August 1975 in Plzeň) is a Czech professional footballer who plays for Černice Plzeň.

He played in the Czech First League for FC Viktoria Plzeň, making eight appearances in the 1996–97 season. He also played for TJ Přestice before going to Croatia to have a short spell with NK Zadar in the Croatian First League. Afterwards, he had a spell with FK Makedonija Gjorče Petrov in the Macedonian First League before moving to Germany where he played seven seasons with 1. FC Bad Kötzting. He joined SSV Jahn Regensburg in 2006, returning to Bad Kötzting five years later.

References

External links 
 
 
 Stats from Croatia at HRrepka 

1975 births
Living people
Sportspeople from Plzeň
Czech footballers
Association football forwards
3. Liga players
FC Viktoria Plzeň players
NK Zadar players
SSV Jahn Regensburg players
Croatian Football League players
Expatriate footballers in Croatia
FK Makedonija Gjorče Petrov players
Expatriate footballers in North Macedonia
Expatriate footballers in Germany